The Thulin N was a prototype Swedish scout aircraft built in the late 1910s.

Design and development
The Thulin N was a two-seat biplane. Both the upper and lower wings were fitted with knuckles which were connected by a push rod. The fuselage was provided with an open cockpit where one was placed in a tandem location. The fuselage is made of a lattice construction of welded steel pipes . The wheel ground was fixed with a spur spring under the height knob. Although the Swedish military asked Thulin to use a 150-hp Benz engine as the powerplant, Thulin opted for a Thulin G rotary engine.

Specifications

See also

References

Biplanes
Single-engined tractor aircraft
1910s Swedish aircraft
Aircraft first flown in 1917